Christine Mos (De Wijk, July 14, 1972 ) is a former Dutch cyclist. In 2003 Mos achieved second place in the Dutch road cycling championship. Her top results include 9th in the Rotterdam Tour and 5th in the Ronde van Gelderland.

Key results
Source:

2001
 12th,  Dutch National Road Race Championships
2002
 9th, Rotterdam Tour
 7th,  Dutch National Road Race Championships
2003
 2nd,  Dutch National Road Race Championships
 5th, Ronde van Gelderland
2004
 31st, Holland Ladies Tour
 7th, Ronde van Gelderland
2005
 15th, Sparkassen Giro Bochum
 21st,  Dutch National Road Race Championships
2006
 39th, Holland Ladies Tour
 31st, RaboSter Zeeuwsche Eilanden
 11th, Omloop Het Volk
2007
 50th, Tour de Bretagne Féminin
 16th,  Dutch National Road Race Championships
 18th, Omloop door Middag-Humsterland
 9th, Ronde van Gelderland

References

Living people
Dutch female cyclists
1972 births
People from De Wolden
Cyclists from Drenthe
21st-century Dutch women